List of rivers flowing in the island of Sulawesi, Indonesia.

In alphabetical order

By province

Central Sulawesi

Gorontalo

North Sulawesi

South Sulawesi

Southeast Sulawesi

West Sulawesi

See also
 List of rivers of Indonesia

References

 
Sulawesi